Appata Siri is a 2017 Sri Lankan Sinhala comedy film directed by Lal Priyadeva and co-produced by N. Udaya Kumara and P. Arooran for Balaji Cine Films and Manon Cine Combines. It stars Mahendra Perera in a dual role with Prashani Perera in lead roles along with Rajiv Nanayakkara and Chalaka Chamupathi. The music was composed by Edward Jayakody. This is the first cinematic appearance by singer Chalaka Chamupathi. It is the 1287th Sri Lankan film in the Sinhala cinema.

Plot
Ranaweera is an ordinary man without a job. Suraweera is a wealthy businessman. They both share the same identical looks in this comedy although they have never met. Ranaweera discovers Suraweera and tries to deceive everyone and take on the wealthy lifestyle of Suraweera.

Cast
 Mahendra Perera as Mahamudalige Ranaweera / Suraweera Mayadunne
 Prashani Perera as Nadeera Mayadunne
 Chalaka Chamupathi as Pushpadantha Boralugoda
 Hyacinth Wijeratne as Rathnawathi Alapatha Kumarihami
 Rajiv Nanayakkara as Lawyer Debokkawala Chinthaka Kavinda
 Inoka Edirisinghe as Thilini, Lawyer's wife
 Teddy Vidyalankara as Walankade Newton
 Bandula Wijeweera as Chandrapala
 Don Guy
 Sanet Dikkumbura as Amaradasa kapuwa
 Sunil Premakumara as Upali

Songs

References

External links
 

2017 films
2010s Sinhala-language films
2017 comedy films
Sri Lankan comedy films